Deh-e Pagah or Dehpagah may refer to:
 Deh-e Pagah, Kazerun
 Dehpagah, Sepidan